Ankarinarivo Manirisoa is a town and commune in Madagascar. It belongs to the district of Fianarantsoa II, which is a part of Haute Matsiatra Region. The population of the commune was estimated to be approximately 8,000 according to a 2001 commune census.

Only primary schooling is available. The majority 99.5% of the population of the commune are farmers.  The most important crops are rice and grapes, while other important agricultural products are pineapple and cassava. Services provide employment for 0.5% of the population.

References and notes 

Populated places in Haute Matsiatra